Mississippi Highway 365 (MS 365) is a state highway in northeastern Mississippi. The route starts at MS 30 in Burton and travels northward. It travels into Burnsville and intersects U.S. Route 72 (US 72). MS 365 continues northeastward and ends at MS 25 west of Pickwick Lake. The route was designated by 1950, connecting from MS 30 to MS 364. It was extended northward to MS 356 around 1958 and was completely paved by 1964. The route replaced parts of MS 356 in 1965, and its northern terminus was changed to MS 25.

Route description

The route is located in northeastern Prentiss and western Tishomingo counties. MS 365 is legally defined in Mississippi Code § 65-3-3, and all of it is maintained by the Mississippi Department of Transportation (MDOT), as part of the Mississippi State Highway System.

MS 365 starts at a three-way junction with MS 30 in the unincorporated community of Burton of Prentiss County, and it travels northwards through a forested area. The route intersects County Road 2312 (CO 2312) and turns northwest briefly. Past CO 2321, the road begins travelling in a straight line until it reaches CO 2360. After the intersection, MS 365 crosses over Dead Man Branch and reaches the community of Cairo. Inside Cairo, the route intersects MS 364. The road then meets the eastern terminus of MS 356 after intersecting CO 1461. At CO 205, the route enters Tishomingo County.

Inside Tishomingo County, the route turns northeastward and crosses over the Redmont Railway near Holt Spur. MS 365 then turns north at CO 160, and crosses Berea Creek near CO 265, a road leading to Leedy. Travelling along the Tennessee–Tombigbee Waterway, the road enters the corporate limits of Burnsville north of CO 212. MS 365 meets US 72 at a partial cloverleaf interchange near the center of the town, and crosses over Front Street, a Norfolk Southern railroad, and Pine Street respectively. The road intersects a connector to Pine Street, and leaves the town north of CO 294. It crosses Little Yellow and Caney creeks near CO 298 and turns northeast. In Doskie, the route intersects CO 293, which leads to a fishing area. MS 365 continues through the forested area, intersecting CO 303 and CO 306 northwest of Cross Roads. Past CO 326, the route turns east and ends at MS 25. The road continues eastward as CO 306, ending at a dead end west of Pickwick Lake.

History
The gravel road that became MS 365 existed since 1928 in northeastern Prentiss County, and it became part of MS 30 in 1936. The designation switched to MS 32 in 1942 for a year, and was removed in 1943, leaving the route unnumbered. By 1950, MS 365 was designated, from MS 30 to MS 364. In 1957, MS 365 was extended south to MS 4, but it was removed the next year. Instead it was extended north to MS 356, south of Burnsville. In 1959, a $246,395 project to pave a  section of the road from Burton to Cairo started. Four years later, another part of the route from Cairo to Burnsville began grading and adding drainage and culverts. All of MS 365 was paved by 1964. By 1965, MS 365 replaced MS 356 north of Burnsville, and MS 356's eastern terminus changed to MS 365.

Major intersections

See also
List of Mississippi state highways

References

365
Transportation in Prentiss County, Mississippi
Transportation in Tishomingo County, Mississippi